Shane Wighton (born 15 September 1991) is an American engineer best known for his YouTube channel, Stuff Made Here: an engineering-focused channel where Wighton builds various innovative inventions. Wighton launched the channel in March 2020. As of August 2022, Stuff Made Here has over 4.08 million subscribers and over 231 million total views. With average view counts per video topping 5.5 million, the videos are amongst the most watched engineering project content on the platform.

Wighton's YouTube channel, Stuff Made Here, was nominated for the Technology Subject Award at the 10th Streamy Awards.

Content 
As of September 1st, 2021, his most viewed video, entitled "Moving hoop won't let you miss", has over 24 million views. In the video, he creates a basketball hoop that uses various motors to adjust its angle within a 600 millisecond timeframe, in order for the basketball to always go into the basketball net. His first variation of the net was not built using electronics, but utilizes a curved backboard in order to redirect the ball into the net from most angles. 

During the COVID-19 pandemic, while stuck at home, he built a robot that cuts hair using various sensors and scissors. For Halloween, he converted the hair-cutting machine into a machine that maps images and carves intricate designs onto pumpkins. 

On June 2, 2020, he posted a video where he created a golf-club that automatically adjusts to achieve certain distances and club types. 

Wighton has also posted two videos where he created multiple versions of baseball bats that utilize blank cartridges and pistons to try to beat the world home-run distance record. 

On February 15, 2021, Wighton posted a video in which he created a pool table and cue stick that analyses every potential shot and projects the best option on the table itself which one player can then attempt. The cue stick will tilt up, down, left, and right to compensate for bad aiming by a player in order to attempt the shot with a high level of accuracy. 

In April 2021, Wighton made a "robotic chainsaw" using a chainsaw and a Tormach ZA06 Robot.

Professional life 
Wighton attended the University of North Carolina at Charlotte, where he received a bachelor’s degree in mechanical engineering and a master’s degree in computer science. Wighton formerly led an engineering team at Formlabs that makes 3D printers that utilize stereolithography and selective laser sintering technology. He is an inventor with five patents and 13 pending applications.

Gallery

References 

American YouTubers
Living people
YouTube channels launched in 2020
1991 births